Martina Halter (born 5 September 1994) is a Swiss volleyball player. She is a member of the Women's National Team.
She participated at the 2013 Women's European Volleyball Championship, and 2017 Montreux Volley Masters. 
She plays for Viteos NUC.

Clubs 
  Viteos Neuchatel Université 
  Viteos NUC (2017–)

References

External links 

 FIVB Profile
 CEV profile
 Headlines

1994 births
Living people
Swiss women's volleyball players
Place of birth missing (living people)